The men's 50 kilometres walk event at the 2006 Commonwealth Games was held on March 24.

Results

References
Results

Walk
2006